is a Japanese manga series written and illustrated by Yuhki Kamatani. It was serialized in Square Enix's shōnen manga magazine Monthly GFantasy from May 2004 to August 2010, with its chapters collected in 14 tankōbon volumes. In North America, it was licensed for English release by Yen Press. A 26-episode anime television series by J.C.Staff was broadcast in Japan on TV Tokyo from April to September 2008. In North America, the anime series was licensed by Funimation.

Plot

Miharu Rokujo is a modern-day Japanese student apathetic to the world around him. One day, Miharu is protected from a ninja by Koichi Aizawa and Tobari Kumohira, who are ninja affiliated with the Banten Village. He learns that his body carries the Shinra Banshou, a scroll that holds the most powerful secret art in the ninja world of Nabari. Because the Grey Wolves, a faction associated with Iga Village that wants to use the Shinra Banshou for their personal gain, will kill Miharu for the secret art, Miharu cannot return to his normal life.

Although he wants nothing to do with ninja, Tobari vows to protect him until he becomes Nabari's ruler. Miharu instead asks that the Shinra Banshou be removed, which has never been successfully done. Soon after, Raimei Shimizu, a samurai from the neighboring Fuuma ninja village, arrives to test Miharu's abilities. Eventually, Raimei invites the Banten ninja to see Kotarou Fuuma, the leader of Fuuma Village. Because he has written every text on ninjutsu, he may find a way to remove the Shinra Banshou.

At Fuuma Village, they discover that the Grey Wolves are searching for Fuuma Village's forbidden art. The Grey Wolves recognize Miharu as the one who possesses the Shinra Banshou, and Yoite - a user of Iga's forbidden art of Kira - attacks. The Grey Wolves escape soon after. With this, the Fuuma and Banten ninja realize that the Grey Wolves are collecting the forbidden arts in the hope of finding a way to remove the Shinra Banshou from Miharu. The Fuuma and Banten follow suit.

After Miharu returns to the Banten village, he is approached by Yoite. Yoite wishes that his existence be erased. If Miharu does not comply, Tobari, Aizawa, and Raimei will die. As Miharu tries to gain enough control over the Shinra Banshou to grant Yoite's wish, the Grey Wolves, Fuuma, and Banten collect the forbidden arts from the other ninja villages. After learning that the Grey Wolves will kill Yoite, he, his caretaker Kazuhiko Yukimi, and his physician Kazuho Amatatsu defect from the Grey Wolves and join Banten. Raikō Shimizu and Gau Meguro also leave the faction, and with Raimei, the three reestablish the nearly extinct Shimizu clan.

Aizawa and Shijima Kurookano are revealed to have gained immortality long ago through the Shinra Banshou's power, and the two separate from the Banten ninja. During a Grey Wolf attack on Banten, Yoite overuses the Kira, which drains the user's life, and dies. Honoring Yoite's wish, Miharu uses the Shinra Banshou to erase Yoite's existence. Fuuma is also found to be working with the Grey Wolves. Tobari is able to complete a ninjutsu that will remove the Shinra Banshou. First, he will use Banten's forbidden art to return the memories everyone in Nabari lost.

Ten years ago, Tobari and his grandfather attempted to remove the Shinra Banshou from the body of Asahi, Miharu's mother. Before they could, Miharu's father, Tobari's grandfather, and Miharu were killed by a cloaked figure. Asahi went insane from the shock and brought Miharu back to life, losing her own life and transferring the Shinra Banshou to Miharu in the process. In the present, Tobari tries to remove the Shinra Banshou from Miharu, but the cloaked figure reappears. His hood falls back, and the figure is revealed to be Fuuma.

Miharu withdraws into himself, while Asahi battles with the Shinra Banshou. The Shinra Banshou wants Miharu to remain apathetic and self-isolated, while Asahi wants her son to trust people again. Eventually, Miharu realizes he doesn't have to hide from people anymore, and grows more confident. Asahi is pleased with her son, and vanishes. The Shinra Banshou decides to return everybody's memories of ten years ago, noting that there are still "lies" in Miharu's heart.

Meanwhile, Ichiki has also remembered what happened ten years ago - and for some reason, this prompts her to kill Hattori. She then opens her eyes for the first time, suggesting that she is not blind after all. She decides to return to where the Shinra Banshou is, clearly planning something. Fuuma meanwhile explains that his goals are to attain wisdom beyond human knowledge, and essentially "become God". Tobari, hurt by his betrayal, attacks him. Raimei and Raikō also return to protect Miharu, making it clear they are no longer on Fuuma's side. Shijima and Kouichi, too, call off their long alliance with Fuuma. The chapter ends with Tobari being horribly wounded by Fuuma. Fuuma begins to absorb the knowledge from Miharu, but then withers away after Tobari stabs him in the neck. Kouichi and Shijima decide to leave with the Shinra Banshou, they will forever sleep "with their mother." Miharu is able to see Yoite one last time.

The story ends with a large party to celebrate Tobari's recovery. In Hana's backyard everyone is gathered and Miharu says he wishes to talk a lot about Kouichi, Shijima, and Yoite. Miharu holds a new cat named Yoi and looks toward the sun knowing he can live openly and happy, his friends and family resting in peace.

Media

Manga

Nabari no Ou is written and illustrated by Yuhki Kamatani. The series ran in Square Enix's shōnen manga magazine Monthly GFantasy from May 18, 2004 to August 18, 2010. Square Enix collected its chapters in fourteen tankōbon volumes from November 27, 2004 to January 27, 2011.

In North America, the manga was licensed for English release by Yen Press. The manga was serialized in Yen Press' Yen Plus anthology magazine, from its first issue, released on July 29, 2008. The fourteen volumes were published from May 12, 2009 to July 23, 2013.

Anime

An anime adaptation directed by Kunihisa Sugishima, and animated by J.C.Staff premiered in Japan on TV Tokyo on April 6, 2008. The series aired weekly, with each episode subsequently airing on various other TXN networks, including TV Aichi, TVQ Kyushu Broadcasting, TV Osaka, TV Setouchi, and TV Hokkaido. The series ran for a total of twenty-six episodes.

On August 19, 2008 Funimation, on the behalf of d-rights, sent cease and desist orders to the fansub groups who were subtitling the series, to prevent copyright infringement, although the company did not have licensing rights at the time.

On December 24, 2008, Funimation announced that they will be releasing the English dub of the anime in 2009. At Otakon 2009, the first episode was shown in English at a Funimation panel. The first DVD was released on September 22, 2009.

The series made its North American television debut when it started airing on the Funimation Channel on March 29, 2010.

Reception

Nabari no Ou was a finalist in the 2005 Japan Media Arts Festival and was a recommended title.

References

External links
 Official Square-Enix manga website 
 Official Yen Press manga website 
 Official Nabari no Ou anime website 
 Official TV Tokyo anime website 
 Official Funimation anime website
 

Anime series based on manga
Funimation
Gangan Comics manga
J.C.Staff
Martial arts anime and manga
NBCUniversal Entertainment Japan
Ninja in anime and manga
Shōnen manga
Supernatural anime and manga
Transgender in anime and manga
Yen Press titles